

Fritz Kraemer (12 December 1900 – 23 June 1959) was a high-ranking Waffen-SS commander and war criminal during the Nazi era. During World War II, he commanded the I SS Panzer Corps and the SS Division Hitlerjugend. After the war, Kramer was tried and convicted at the Malmedy massacre trial for his role in the Malmedy Massacre, receiving a 10-year sentence.

During World War II, Kraemer initially served with the 13th Infantry Division. In January 1943, he was appointed as a staff officer of the I SS Panzer Corps commanded by Sepp Dietrich. Kraemer was admitted into the SS on 1 August 1944.  During the battles in Normandy, Krämer acted as Dietrich’s deputy, and eventually succeeded Hubert Meyer as commander of the SS Division Hitlerjugend. He was in charge of the division until 13 November 1944.

Kraemer later served as a chief of staff with the 6th Panzer Army and surrendered to the U.S. Army, along with Dietrich, in May 1945. He was tried in 1946 for his role in the Malmedy Massacre. He was found guilty of war crimes for his role in the drafting and transmission of illegal orders. The orders directed that prisoners of war could be shot "if necessary, in very compelling situations". Kraemer was sentenced to 10 years in prison. He was released in 1952, and died in 1959.

Awards
 	
 German Cross in Gold (1942)
 Iron Cross Second Class (1939) and First Class (1940)
 Knight's Cross of the Iron Cross on 17 December 1942 as Oberstleutnant im Generalstab (i.G.; in the General Staff) and Ia (operations officer) in the 13. Panzer-Division

References

Citations

Bibliography

 

1900 births
1959 deaths
Military personnel from Szczecin
People from the Province of Pomerania
SS-Brigadeführer
Recipients of the Gold German Cross
Recipients of the Knight's Cross of the Iron Cross
Waffen-SS personnel
People convicted in the Malmedy massacre trial
German prisoners of war in World War II held by the United States